Santa Cruz/Graciosa Bay/Luova Airport is an airport serving Nendo, the largest of the Santa Cruz Islands, in the Solomon Islands .

Airlines and destinations

External links
Solomon Airlines Routes

Airports in the Solomon Islands